Prime Aviation JSC is a private airline established in 2005 and based in Almaty, Kazakhstan operating charter and business flights from its bases of Almaty Airport, Atyrau Airport and Astana Airport.

History

Fleet 
The Prime Aviation fleet consists of the following aircraft (as of August 2019):

The Prime Aviation fleet previously included the following aircraft (as of November 2012):

References

External links 
 

Airlines of Kazakhstan
Airlines established in 2005